David Levinson may refer to:

 David A. Levinson, American soap opera writer
 David M. Levinson (born 1967), American civil engineer and transportation analyst
 David N. Levinson (?–2019), American politician and former Insurance Commissioner of Delaware
 David S. Levinson (born 1969), American short story writer and novelist
 David Levinson (producer), American television producer and writer
 David Levinson, protagonist of the Independence Day franchise, portrayed by Jeff Goldblum